Dame Felicity Ann Emwhyla Lott,  (born 8 May 1947) is an English soprano.

Education
Lott was born in Cheltenham, Gloucestershire.  From her earliest years she was musical, having started studying piano at age 5. She also played violin and began singing lessons at 12. She is an alumna of Royal Holloway, University of London, obtaining a BA in French and Latin in 1969. During her year in France as part of her four-year degree course, from 1967–68 she took singing lessons at the conservatory in Grenoble. She graduated from the Royal Academy of Music, winning the Principal's Prize.

Career
She made her debut in 1975 as Pamina in Mozart's The Magic Flute at the English National Opera. In 1976 she appeared in the premiere of Henze's We Come to the River at the Royal Opera House Covent Garden and began a long relationship with the Glyndebourne Festival. In 1977, she recorded for Emi records Ltd, with the Choir of King's College, Cambridge and the Academy of St. Martin-in-the-Fields, conducted by Philip Ledger, the famous Charpentier's Te Deum H.146.  

She has been associated with the works of Richard Strauss including various lieder, the Four Last Songs and the roles of the Marschallin in Der Rosenkavalier and the Countess in Capriccio. She has also appeared in operettas, singing the title role in Franz Lehár's The Merry Widow at Glyndebourne, as well as Rosalinde in Die Fledermaus and the title roles in Offenbach's La belle Hélène and La Grande-Duchesse de Gérolstein.

She has a special love for French "mélodies", German "Lieder" and the English song repertoire, particularly the songs of Benjamin Britten. She is a founding member of Songmakers' Almanac. Her accompanist since her student days has been Graham Johnson, and they have given a great number of recitals together. She also has performed duet recitals with mezzo-soprano Ann Murray, baritone Thomas Allen and Austrian mezzo-soprano Angelika Kirchschlager. She is also featured as a soloist in a recording of the Mozart Requiem in D Minor with the London Philharmonic Choir and Orchestra. For Hyperion Records, Lott has recorded many songs, by Chabrier, Fauré, Gounod, Hahn, Poulenc, and Schubert, often with Graham Johnson, and for Chandos Records, songs by Richard Strauss and Wolf, among others.

Lott is a member of the Incorporated Society of Musicians as well as Patron of the Southwell Music Festival.

Honours and awards
Felicity Lott has received many honorary doctorates, including the Universities of Oxford, London, Leicester, Sussex, the Royal Scottish Academy of Music and Drama, Glasgow and the Sorbonne in Paris. She has been elected to the French Legion of Honor and made a DBE in 1996. She sang at the wedding of Prince Andrew in 1986. In 2003 Dame Felicity was awarded the title of Bayerische Kammersängerin. She is Vice-President of British Youth Opera and The Bach Choir.

In autumn 2009 it was announced that she had been appointed a Visiting Professor by Royal Holloway having previously been appointed an Honorary Fellow of the college.

On 9 February 2010, she was presented with The Wigmore Hall Medal by the Duke of Kent KG, at the launch of the hall's 110th anniversary programme. The medal was introduced in 2006 and is awarded to internationally important artistic figures in recognition of their significant contribution to Wigmore Hall. The two previous recipients are Matthias Goerne and András Schiff. The citation praised her "unique contribution to Wigmore Hall and to the advancement of the song recital as a concert-going experience throughout the world." It was 35 years since she first performed there in 1975.

She is a Patron of the British Voice Association and has been a Patron of Bampton Classical Opera.

Family
She is married to the actor Gabriel Woolf; they have a daughter, Emily (b. 1984).

Videography
 Glyndebourne Festival Opera: a Gala Evening (1992), Arthaus Musik DVD, 100–432, 2004

See also
 Grenoble Conservatory, in French, section on alumni:- Liste des anciens élèves du conservatoire

References

External links

Hyperion Records page/Lott
An interview with Felicity Lott recorded in 1992  – a British Library sound recording
Interview with Felicity Lott by Bruce Duffie, 19 November 1987
 BBC Desert Island Discs 13 July 2008, accessed 20 January 2013

1947 births
Living people
Alumni of Royal Holloway, University of London
Fellows of the Royal Academy of Music
Dames Commander of the Order of the British Empire
Recipients of the Legion of Honour
Singers awarded knighthoods
English operatic sopranos
People from Cheltenham
Musicians from Gloucestershire
20th-century British women opera singers